Amery is an unincorporated area and community in Census division 23 in Northern Manitoba, Canada, located  northeast of the Limestone Generating Station (on the Nelson River). Administratively, it is part of the large Town of Gillam.

History
Amery was founded with the building of the Hudson Bay Railway in the early part of the second decade of the 20th century. When the originally intended final section line route north east to Port Nelson was abandoned, the new final section route north to Churchill, which opened in 1929, was branched off at Amery.

Transportation
Amery is the site of Amery railway station, served by the Via Rail Winnipeg–Churchill train.

References

Unincorporated communities in Northern Region, Manitoba